Cathal mac Ruaidhri (died 1043) was King of Maigh Seóla/Iar Connacht.

Biography

Cathal was the great-grandson of Flaithbheartach mac Eimhin, the eponym of the Ua Flaithbertaig chiefs and fourth great-grandson of Murchadh mac Maenach, the namesake of the Muintir Murchada. The year after he became king, the annals record that "Cathal, son of Ruaidhri, lord of West Connaught, went on his pilgrimage to Ard-Macha (Armagh)." He appears to have died there in 1043. He was succeeded by his son, Amhalgaidh.

References

 West or H-Iar Connaught Ruaidhrí Ó Flaithbheartaigh, 1684 (published 1846, ed. James Hardiman).
 Origin of the Surname O'Flaherty, Anthony Matthews, Dublin, 1968, p.40.
 Irish Kings and High-Kings, Francis John Byrne (2001), Dublin: Four Courts Press, 
 Annals of Ulster at CELT: Corpus of Electronic Texts at University College Cork
 Byrne, Francis John (2001), Irish Kings and High-Kings, Dublin: Four Courts Press, 

People from County Galway
1043 deaths
11th-century Irish monarchs
Year of birth unknown